The Feather Lakes are a chain of four small alpine glacial lakes in Boise County, Idaho, United States, located in the Sawtooth Mountains in the Sawtooth National Recreation Area.  The lakes are located on Goat Creek which is a tributary of the South Fork Payette River.  There are no trails leading to the lakes or the Goat Creek drainage.

The Feather Lakes are in the Sawtooth Wilderness, and a wilderness permit can be obtained at a registration box at trailheads or wilderness boundaries.  The lakes are upstream of Blue Rock Lake and downstream of Little Warbonnet Lake and Warbonnet Lake.

References

See also

 List of lakes of the Sawtooth Mountains (Idaho)
 Sawtooth National Forest
 Sawtooth National Recreation Area
 Sawtooth Range (Idaho)

Lakes of Idaho
Lakes of Boise County, Idaho
Glacial lakes of the United States
Glacial lakes of the Sawtooth Wilderness